Arnon Afek (born May 18, 1963) is an Israeli physician who specializes in pathology and medical management. Afek served as Director-General of the Israeli Ministry of Health in 2014–2015. He is currently Deputy Director-General of Sheba Medical Center and acting director of Sheba General Hospital at Tel Hashomer.

Biography
Arnon Afek was born in Haifa. His father, Dr. Yigal Afek, was an engineer, and his mother, Shoshana, was a teacher. Afek grew up in Tel Aviv. In 1981–1987, he studied at the Hebrew University and Hadassah Medical School in Jerusalem, graduating with distinction. He did his internship at Beilinson Hospital (Rabin Medical Center) in Petah Tikva in 2000-2002 and residency in pathological anatomy at Sheba Medical Center. In 2002 to 2004, he earned an MSc in Health Administration at Ben-Gurion University of the Negev, graduating with honors, and specialized in medical administration at Sheba and the Ministry of Health.

Military career
After graduating from medical school, Afek served in the Israel Defense Forces as a military physician.  In 2004–2007, he was head of the Occupational Medicine and Medical Classification branch of the IDF, as well as chairman of the Department of Medical Administration of the IDF Medical Corps. He serves in the reserves as a member of the IDF-MC Helsinki Committee at the rank of Colonel (Res).

During his time in the military, Afek changed the concept of medical classification and promoted volunteering for military service.

Medical and academic career
Afek is a professor of public health and Director of the New York State/American MD program at Tel Aviv University. He teaches at Tel Aviv University's Sackler Faculty of Medicine and Coller School of Management, and holds an associate professorship at the School of Medicine of the University of Nicosia in Cyprus. In 2011–2013, he taught at Bar Ilan University. Since 2018, he has been lecturing on healthcare innovation in the international MBA program of the Arison School of Business at the IDC Herzliya.

In 2008, Afek was appointed Deputy Director-General of Chaim Sheba Medical Center.

Afek is the founding Chairman of the National Council of Pathology and Forensic Medicine of the Israeli Ministry of Health. 
In addition, Afek chairs the Association of Israeli Hospital Management and the Israel Medical Association World Federation. He is a former member of the OECD Health Committee Bureau of Governance.

In January 2012, he was appointed director of Medical Affairs of the Ministry of Health, becoming Director-General of the Ministry in May 2014. He led the regulatory reform on medical canabis.

In 2017, he was a contributing editor to a special issue of the medical journal The Lancet, focusing on health in Israel.

In July 2019, he was appointed Chief Medical Advisor of the Ministry of Health's Medical Cannabis Unit.

Awards and recognition
Afek has published over 150 peer-reviewed articles on topics ranging from obesity and other risk factors in cardiovascular disease to vascular disease, diabetes and cancer in adolescents, and the immunopathogenesis of atherosclerosis. His studies were published in leading journals including The New England Journal of Medicine, The Lancet, Circulation, Jama etc.

Afek has won numerous awards, among them the Goldenberg Award and the Kellerman Prize for research in cardiology.  In 2016, he was the recipient of the Israel Civil Service Commission Award, The highest award given to a senior public servant in Israel.

Publications
 Yuval Lendscheft, Elbo Boaz, Rephael Meshulam, Arnon Afek. Medical Cannabis – Clinical Guideline (The Green Book). 2019 3rd edition. Israeli Ministry of Health Publications, Jerusalem, Israel

References

1963 births
Israeli government officials
The Hebrew University-Hadassah Medical School alumni
Academic staff of Tel Aviv University
Academic staff of Bar-Ilan University
Israeli pathologists
Israeli military doctors
Israeli corporate directors
Living people